There is a large community of Mauritanians in Senegal, including tens of thousands of black Mauritanians expelled by their own government during a 1989 border incident.

Migration history
In early 1989, tensions arose between Mauritania and Senegal due to conflicts over water resources in the Sénégal River valley. As a result, white Mauritanian Moors in the Senegalese capital Dakar became the targets of communal violence, while in Mauritania itself, black Mauritanians came under suspicion as "Senegalese fifth columnists". To prevent further violence, the governments of Mauritania and Senegal began to organise mutual repatriations of their citizens from each other's territories in April that year; however, Mauritania did not just remove Senegalese citizens, but an estimated 70,000 black Mauritanians as well. Those expelled were largely of Halpuular ethnicity. The border between the two countries would not be reopened until April 1992.

Repatriation began slowly after the reopening of the border. Refugees returning to Trarza and Brakna generally found conditions to be good, but those going back to Gorgol and Guidimaka complained of continued discrimination by local authorities. Reports in early 2013 indicated that returnees continued to face difficulties resettling in their former villages and regaining access to the lands they had once farmed due to their lack of identification documents.

Footnotes

Bibliography

Further reading

External links
Réfugiés négro-mauritaniens au Sénégal, a photo exhibition by Elodie Perriot

Ethnic groups in Senegal
Senegal